James Marshall House may refer to:

James W. Marshall House, Lambertville, New Jersey, listed on the National Register of Historic Places (NRHP)
James G. Marshall House, Niagara Falls, New York, NRHP-listed
James E. Marshall House, Sandusky, Ohio, listed on the NRHP in Sandusky, Ohio
 James Marshall House (Shepherdstown, West Virginia), NRHP-listed

See also
Marshall House (disambiguation)